The Yokosuka MXY5 was a Japanese military glider produced for the Imperial Japanese Navy during World War II. The glider consisted of fabric-wrapped plywood covering a tubular steel frame. The design also featured a retractable undercarriage as well as an emergency skid. The design was flight tested in 1942. Only 12 were produced and none were used operationally.

Variants
MXY5original version; nine built
MXY5alater version; three built

Specifications (MXY5 and MXY5a)

References

MXY5, Yokosuka
1940s military gliders
MXY5
High-wing aircraft
Aircraft first flown in 1942